Katja Trödthandl (born 18 May 1989) is an Austrian footballer who plays as a midfielder for SV Neulengbach and the Austria national team. She previously played in the Spanish First Division for Valencia CF. Prior to this she had a first spell in the ÖFB-Frauenliga with SV Neulengbach, whom she also represented in the European Cup, and two spells with USC Landhaus. She made her debut for the Austrian national team in September 2006 against the Netherlands.

References

External links

 
 Profile at SV Neulengbach 

1989 births
Living people
Austrian women's footballers
Expatriate women's footballers in Spain
Austria women's international footballers
Austrian expatriate footballers
SV Neulengbach (women) players
Austrian expatriate sportspeople in Spain
USC Landhaus Wien players
Footballers from Vienna
Valencia CF Femenino players
Women's association football midfielders
ÖFB-Frauenliga players